The 2018 United States Men's Curling Championship was held from March 3 to 10 at the Scheels Arena in Fargo, North Dakota. It was held in conjunction with the 2018 United States Women's Curling Championship.

Teams
Ten teams qualified to participate in the 2018 national championship.

Round-robin standings 
Final round-robin standings

Round-robin results 
All draw times are listed in Central Standard Time.

Draw 1 
Saturday, March 03, 4:30pm

Draw 2 
Sunday, March 04, 8:00am

Draw 3 
Sunday, March 04, 4:00pm

Draw 4 
Monday, March 05, 10:00am

Draw 5 
Monday, March 05, 7:00pm

Draw 6 
Tuesday, March 06, 12:00pm

Draw 7 
Tuesday, March 06, 8:00pm

Draw 8 
Wednesday, March 07, 12:00pm

Draw 9 
Wednesday, March 07, 8:00pm

Playoffs

1 vs. 2 
Thursday, March 8, 8:00pm

3 vs. 4 
Thursday, March 8, 8:00pm

Semifinal 
Friday, March 9, 7:00pm

Final
Saturday, March 10, 5:00 pm CT

References

External links

United States Men's Curling Championship
Curling competitions in North Dakota
United States National Curling Championships
Curling Men's Championship
Curling United States Men's Championship
Sports in Fargo, North Dakota